Chickpea bread is a type of bread made from chickpea flour from Albania and Turkey. Notably, instead of regular yeast, a yeast found on chickpeas is used; this yeast is mixed with flour and water and left out overnight in a warm place. The next day, the dough is cut into pieces, placed on a tray and baked. in Albania it is also called QAHI and it is baked as dinner rolls

See also
Farinata

References

Albanian breads
Turkish breads
Chickpea dishes